Shlomi Avisidris (born 14 May 1989) is an Israeli footballer. Avisidris is the only footballer who played in all leagues in his country.

Career
Avisidris is a protege of Ironi Kiryat Shmona youth ranks and in 2008 he became a permanent player in the senior team. As part of the senior team, he scored the winning goal for Kiryat Shmona in the 2011 Toto Cup final, the first major trophy of the club. However, Avisidris' involvement in criminal activities, which included a conviction in drug offences, sent the player to loan periods in Hapoel Ra'anana, Bnei Yehuda, Hapoel Ramat Gan and Hapoel Asi Gilboa.

In September 2013, Avisidris was transferred from Kiryat Shmona to Maccabi Umm al-Fahm. However, the troubled team, which was included in Liga Leumit in the last moment and had to field its youth team for league matches, couldn't keep the player, and transferred him to Liga Alef club, F.C. Karmiel Safed. However, as Avisidris didn't fit in the club, he was loaned to Liga Gimel club, Hapoel Ironi Safed, with which Avisidris won the Upper Galilee division and was promoted to Liga Bet. The loan became a permanent transfer at the end of the season.

At the beginning of the 2015–16 season, Avisidris returned to the second division, as he was loaned to Hapoel Rishon LeZion.

On 20 June 2016 signed to the Israeli Premier League club Beitar Jerusalem.

Honours
Liga Leumit:
2009–10
Liga Gimel:
2013–14
Toto Cup Al:
2010-11
Toto Cup Leumit:
2009–10

References

External links
Stats at sports.walla.co.il 

1989 births
Israeli Jews
Living people
Israeli footballers
Hapoel Ironi Kiryat Shmona F.C. players
Hapoel Ra'anana A.F.C. players
Bnei Yehuda Tel Aviv F.C. players
Hapoel Ramat Gan F.C. players
Hapoel Asi Gilboa F.C. players
Maccabi Umm al-Fahm F.C. players
Hapoel F.C. Karmiel Safed players
Hapoel Ironi Safed F.C. players
Hapoel Bnei Rameh F.C. players
Hapoel Rishon LeZion F.C. players
Beitar Jerusalem F.C. players
Hapoel Marmorek F.C. players
Hapoel Ironi Baqa al-Gharbiyye F.C. players
Israeli Premier League players
Liga Leumit players
Footballers from Kiryat Shmona
Association football midfielders